Butsakon Tantiphana (th: บุษกร ตันติภนา) or Egg (th: เอ้ก, RTGS: Ek), is a Thai actress, singer, teen idol and MC of the Thai Television Channel 3.

References

1988 births
Butsakon Tantiphana
Butsakon Tantiphana
Butsakon Tantiphana
Living people
Butsakon Tantiphana